Surprise Party is a 1983 French comedy-drama film directed by Roger Vadim.

Cast
 Caroline Cellier as Lisa Bourget
 Philippine Leroy-Beaulieu as Anne Lambert
 Christian Vadim as Christian Bourget
 Michel Duchaussoy as François Lambert
 Mylène Demongeot as Geneviève Lambert
 Maurice Ronet as Georges Levesques
 Pascale Roberts as Madame Gisèle
 Yves Barsacq as Brigadier 
 Michel Godin as Marco
 François Perrot as Armando

References

External links

Films directed by Roger Vadim
French comedy-drama films
Films set in the 1950s
1980s French films